Riham Abdul Ghanee (born 2 March 1997), known simply as Boby, is a Maldivian professional footballer who plays as a midfielder for Club Green Streets and Maldives national team.

Club career
Riham started his career with Maldivian third division side Da Grande Sports Club in 2015, helping his side to win the championship and gain promotion to Second Division. In 2016 Second Division, Da Grande lost to the eventual runner-ups Club Zefrol 1–0 in the semi-finals.

Riham started first division football under coach Ihusan Abdul Ghani at Club Eagles in 2017. He debuted for Eagles in the 2017 Malé League opening match against Maziya in which they lost by a goal to nil. On 22 June 2017, Eagles coach Ihusan suspended Riham from the senior squad for the rest of the season along with 2 other players – Ibrahim Mubeen and Hassan Raif Ahmed for involving in futsal tournaments.

He won the 2017 FAM Youth Championship with Club Eagles U21s on 29 December 2017.

On 18 January 2018, Riham joined New Radiant. With New Radiant, Riham played in the AFC Cup for the first time, making six appearances in the group stage. On 14 March 2018, he made his first start at the AFC Cup against Aizawl at home, where they won 3–1. He also won the 2018 Malé League in that season.

Riham signed a 3 year deal with Club Green Streets in February 2019. He later joined to his former club Club Eagles on loan until end of the season, in January 2020.

International career
Riham has represented Maldives at both under-19 and under-23 level. He played in the 2015 SAFF U-19 Championship, 2016 AFC U-19 Championship qualification and also in 2020 AFC U-23 Championship qualification.

On 23 March 2018, Riham made his debut for the senior Maldives national team, at the National Stadium, Singapore, playing in the starting eleven in the friendly game where they lost 3–2 to Singapore. Three days later, on 27 March 2018, Riham made his competitive debut for the Maldives in a 7–0 win over Bhutan in the 2019 AFC Asian Cup qualifiers, coming in as a 69th-minute substitute for Hamza Mohamed.

On 2 September 2020, Petar Segrt included Riham for the 2018 SAFF Championship, the youngster's first senior tournament. He made his only appearance of the tournament in the goalless draw against Sri Lanka in their opening match, replacing Hamza in the second half.

Honours

Club
Da Grande
Third Division: 2015

Club Eagles U21s
FAM Youth Championship: 2017

New Radiant
Malé League: 2018

International
Maldives
SAFF Championship: 2018

References

External links
 
 
 Riham Gani at PlaymakerStats.com

1997 births
Living people
Maldivian footballers
Association football defenders
Maldives international footballers
New Radiant S.C. players
Club Green Streets players
Club Eagles players
Da Grande Sports Club players